Kian Rosenberg Larsson (born 27 June 1992), known professionally as Gilli, is a Danish rapper, singer, and songwriter from Rødovre, Capital Region. After initially growing out of the B.O.C. rap collective and releasing several singles between 2011 and 2013, also as a feature artist, Gilli rose to mainstream prominence in 2014 following the release of the musical drama film Ækte vare (2014), playing a fictionalized version of himself.

His hit songs "C'est la vie" in 2015, "Tidligt Op" in 2016, "Langsom" in 2017, "Tranquillo" in 2018, "Kolde nætter" and "Verden vender" in 2019 all reached the top of the Danish singles chart. Likewise, his debut studio album Kiko (2019) peaked at number one on the Danish Album Charts, with 13 of the album's 16 tracks reaching the singles charts; a record.

In February 2020, his collaborative album Euro Connection as Branco & Gilli (with Branco, a member of MellemFingaMuzik) became his second consecutive number-one album in Denmark. "La danza", the lead single from the album, made it to #1 on the Danish Singles Chart whereas "Back to Business" from the same album made it to #2 on the same chart.

Career
Gilli started as part of the Danish underground and rap collective B.O.C .(also known variously as Bars of Crack, Bombs Over Copenhagen and Bomber Over Centrum) that consisted of the rapper and hip hop artists mostly from Nørrebro.

He had the lead role in Ækte vare, a film directed by Fenar Ahmad, in which he plays Mikael, a Danish kid who grows up in a housing project with mainly foreign immigrants. Along with a group of childhood friends Tariq, Samir and Eddy, Mikael is making music. His talent catches the eye of the established rapper Apollo, who makes Mikael his ghostwriter. 

Gilli's musical commercial breakthrough came through the film and the release of the soundtrack of the film as an EP, Ækte vare. Released on 1 April 2014 on ArtPeople, the 33-minute EP featured MellemFingaMuzik, Murro, Kesi, Højer Øye and Sivas. It sold very well on Spotify and iTunes and reached number 8 on Hitlisten, the official Danish chart. The song "Knokler Hårdt" from the EP went platinum on stream in June 2014. 

Gilli is known for various collaborations, notably with KESI, Sivas, Kato, Medina, Højer Øye, hasan shah and MellemFingaMuzik. His single "C'est la vie" featuring MellemFingaMuzik reached number 1 on Tracklisten, the official Danish singles chart.

Discography

Albums

EPs

Singles

Tracks featuring

Other songs

More collaborations
 Kato – "Fuck hvor er det fedt (at være hiphop'er) (Part 2 G-Mix) (feat. Gilli, Clemens, Sivas m.fl.) (2011)
 Nik og Jay – "Gi mig dine tanker Pt. 2" (feat. Young, KESI, Kidd & Gilli) (2011)
 Rajin – "Farvel" (feat. Gilli) (2012)
 KESI – "Gadehjørne" (feat. Gilli & Mass Ebdrup) (2012)
 Kesi – "Hygger mig" (feat. Gilli) (2013)
 Sivas – "d.a.u.d.a" (feat. Gilli) (2013)
 MellemFingaMuzik – "Gadepenge" (feat. Gilli) (2014)
 MellemFingaMuzik – "Chopped & Skruet" (feat. Gilli & Sivas) (2014)
 AMRO – "Korrupt" (feat. Gilli) (2014)
 Højer Øye – "Brænd System" (feat. Gilli) (2014)
 Medina – "Falske mennesker" (feat. Gilli) (2014)
 Sivas – "Hacket" (feat. Gilli & MellemFingaMuzik) (2014)
 Kesi – "Ik brug for" (feat. Højer Øye & Gilli) (2014)
 Murro – "Søvne" (feat. Gilli) (2015)
 MellemFingaMuzik – "COCAINA" (feat. Gilli) (2015)
 MellemFingaMuzik – "A.P. Møller" (feat. Gilli) (2015)
 MellemFingaMuzik – "STIK AF" (feat. Gilli) (2015)
 MellemFingaMuzik – "SNAKKER" (feat. Gilli) (2015)
 MellemFingaMuzik – "HEROMKRING" (feat. Højer Øye & Gilli) (2015)
 MellemFingaMuzik – "SENERE" (feat. Gilli) (2015)
 Gio – "Psykose" (feat. Gilli & Højer Øye) (2015)
 KESI – "Vors" (feat. Sivas, Gilli) (2015)
 KESI – "H.D.K." (feat. Mass Ebdrup & Gilli) (2015)
 Hasan Snah – "Tyveri" (feat. Gilli) (2015)

Filmography
2014: Ækte vare – in lead role as Mikael (film directed by Fenar Ahmad)

References

External links

Danish rappers
1992 births
Living people
Danish male film actors
21st-century Danish male actors
People from Rødovre